The Diamond Wink Tour, also known as Jagged Little Pill Acoustic Tour, was the fifth concert tour by Canadian singer-songwriter Alanis Morissette. The tour celebrates the 10th anniversary release of the Jagged Little Pill album. Alanis took the commemorative date to re-record the album in an acoustic version, which was named Jagged Little Pill Acoustic. The 1st Leg consisted of electric performances for big audiences throughout Europe, and the 2nd Leg of acoustic performances at intimate venues throughout North America to promote the re-release of the album.

Opening acts

Gabriel Mann
Jude
Lionel Lodge
Schmid Vera
Squeeze Theeze Pleeze
Blister
Beltane
Lullabye
Jason Mraz

Set List
{{hidden
| headercss = background: #ccccff; font-size: 100%; width: 65%;
| contentcss = text-align: left; font-size: 100%; width: 75%;
| header = Leg 1
| content = 
This set list is representative of the performance in Budapest. It does not represent all concerts for the 1st Leg of the tour.
"Eight Easy Steps"
"All I Really Want"
"Hands Clean"
"Spineless"
"Perfect"
"Head Over Feet"
"Excuses"
"Hand in My Pocket"
"So Pure"
"A Man"
"You Learn"
"Everything"
"You Oughta Know"
"Wake Up"
Encore 1
"Your House"
"Uninvited"
Encore 2
"Ironic"
"Thank U"
}}

{{hidden
| headercss = background: #ccccff; font-size: 100%; width: 65%;
| contentcss = text-align: left; font-size: 100%; width: 75%;
| header = Leg 2
| content = 
This set list is representative of the performance in New Orleans. It does not represent all concerts for the 2nd Leg of the tour.
"Your House"
"You Learn"
"Not the Doctor"
"Perfect"
"Hand in My Pocket"
"Sister Blister"
"Head Over Feet"
"Forgiven"
"Mary Jane"
"Hands Clean"
"All I Really Want"
"Everything"
"Right Through You"
"Wake Up"
Encore 1
"You Oughta Know"
"Uninvited"
Encore 2
"Ironic"
"Thank U"
}}

Band
Alanis Morissette – vocals/guitar/harmonica
Jason Paul Orme - guitar
Zac Rae - keyboards
David Levita - guitar
Cedric Lemoyne Williams - bass guitar
Blair Sinta - drums

References

2005 concert tours
Alanis Morissette concert tours